Morton Diston (born 28 May 1936) is a former Australian rules footballer who played with Essendon in the Victorian Football League (VFL). He later returned to his original side, Mitcham, before spending a season with Box Hill in the Victorian Football Association (VFA).

Notes

External links 		
		

Essendon Football Club past player profile
		
		
		

1936 births	
Living people
Australian rules footballers from Victoria (Australia)
Essendon Football Club players
Box Hill Football Club players